M-174 was the designation given to two former state trunklines in the U.S. state of Michigan:

M-174 (1930s Michigan highway) near Buchanan in Berrien County
M-174 (1970s Michigan highway) in Lansing

174